Suren Kerselyan is a former Vice Premier and Minister for Labour, Employment and Social Security of Abkhazia. Kerselyan was appointed as Vice Premier and Labour Minister on 15 October 2014 by newly elected President Raul Khajimba, in the cabinet of Prime Minister Beslan Butba. After Butba was replaced as Prime Minister by Artur Mikvabia, Kerselyan was replaced as Vice Premier by Dmitri Serikov on 8 April 2015.

On 23 August 2016, Kerselyan was also replaced as Labour Minister, by Pension Head Ruslan Ajba, in the new cabinet of Prime Minister Beslan Bartsits.

References

Living people
Ministers for Labour and Social Security of Abkhazia
Vice Premiers of Abkhazia
Abkhaz Armenians
Year of birth missing (living people)